Jack Green (4 October 1921 – 13 September 2005) was an Australian cricketer. He played three first-class cricket matches for Victoria between 1948 and 1949.

See also
 List of Victoria first-class cricketers

References

External links
 

1921 births
2005 deaths
Australian cricketers
Victoria cricketers
Cricketers from Melbourne